The Old Chicago Water Tower District is a historic district along the Magnificent Mile shopping district in the Near North Side community area of Chicago, Illinois.  The district is located on both sides of North Michigan Avenue between East Chicago and East Pearson Streets.  It includes the Chicago Water Tower, Chicago Avenue Pumping Station, and Chicago Fire Department Fire Station No. 98.  All three structures are part of the Chicago Landmark district designated on October 6, 1971 (amended June 10, 1981).   The Water Tower and Pumping Station were jointly added to the National Register of Historic Places on April 23, 1975. In addition the Tower was named an American Water Landmark in 1969. The Water Tower was also one of the few buildings to survive the Great Chicago Fire. The district is the namesake of the nearby Water Tower Place.

The district was once called Tower Town or Towertown and was known for its bohemian artists and nightlife in the early 20th century. In the 1910s, artists moved into an area near Pine St (now North Michigan Avenue) that was being deserted by affluent residents. Tower Town was the resultant artistic district, and it was successful in part because of its proximity to affluent patrons who remained on the Gold Coast. A new bridge connecting the area to the Chicago Loop helped transform Tower Town into an expensive commercial district. Bars and nightclubs in the area included Chez Pierre, the Dil Pickle Club, Kelly's Stables, the Little Club, the Paradise Club and the Tent.

Gallery

See also
 Chicago architecture
 Water tower
 Water Tower Place

Notes

External links

Official City of Chicago Near North Side Community Map

Historic districts in Chicago
Central Chicago
Buildings and structures on the National Register of Historic Places in Chicago
Chicago Landmarks
Towers in Illinois
Historic districts on the National Register of Historic Places in Illinois